Steven Shaw may refer to:

Banachek (Steven Shaw, born 1960), American mentalist and magician
Steve Shaw (actor) (1965–1990), American actor 
Steve Shaw (tennis) (born 1963), British tennis player

See also
Stephen Shaw (disambiguation)